CHLQ-FM is a Canadian radio station broadcasting at 93.1 FM in Charlottetown, Prince Edward Island. The station is owned by the Maritime Broadcasting System and currently broadcasts a mainstream rock format branded on-air as Max 93.1. The station has been on the air since March 1982.

On July 16, 2012, CHLQ switched from adult contemporary/classic hits (Magic 93) to mainstream rock (Q93).

As of early 2017, the Morning Show portion of the program has been renamed from "The Q Morning Crew with Paul and Anne" to "The Unbalanced Breakfast with Joee Adams."m

On April 1, 2022, Q93 rebranded to Max 93.1 maintaining a mainstream rock format.

See also
 CFCY-FM
 CJRW-FM

External links
 Q93
 
 

Hlq
Hlq
Hlq
Radio stations established in 1982
1982 establishments in Prince Edward Island